Genesta was the unsuccessful English challenger in the fifth America's Cup in 1885 against the American defender Puritan.

Design
The cutter Genesta was designed by John Beavor-Webb and built by the D&W Henderson shipyard on the River Clyde in 1884, for owner Sir Richard Sutton, 5th Baronet, of the Royal Yacht Squadron, Cowes, Isle of Wight, England.  She was built of oak planking on a steel frame. Genesta was skippered by John Carter. She was measured , weighing 80 tons.

Career
After a strong showing in the British yacht races in 1884, Sutton crossed the Atlantic Ocean to New York during the summer 1885 aboard Genesta. Upon arrival, designer Beavor-Webb refused to let anyone see his yacht before the America's Cup race, beginning the tradition of secrecy which was over ruled for the 2017 event by the organisers..

After the Cup races, Sutton and Genesta won the Brenton Reef Cup, the Cape May Challenge Cup, and, upon returning to Britain, the first Round Britain Race in 1887, covering the  course in 12 days, 16 hours, and 59 minutes. Genesta was sold and converted to a yawl by the 1890s, and broken up in 1900.

References and external links

America's Cup's Ac-clopaedia
The 19th-Century Yacht Photography of J.S. Johnston

America's Cup challengers
Vessels of the Royal Yacht Squadron
Individual sailing vessels
1885 in sports
Cutters
Yawls